The Michel parameters, usually denoted by  and , are four parameters used in describing the phase space distribution of leptonic decays of charged leptons, . They are named after the physicist Louis Michel. Within the Standard Model of electroweak interactions, these parameters are expected to be

Precise measurements of energy and angular distributions of the daughter leptons in decays of polarized muons and tau leptons are so far in good agreement with these predictions of the Standard Model.

Muon decay

Consider the decay of the positive muon:

In the muon rest frame, energy and angular distributions of the positrons emitted in the decay of a polarised muon expressed in terms of Michel parameters are the following, neglecting electron and neutrino masses and the radiative corrections:

For the decay of the negative muon, the sign of the term containing  should be inverted.

For the decay of the positive muon, the expected decay distribution for the Standard Model values of Michel parameters is

Integration of this expression over electron energy gives the angular distribution of the daughter positrons:

The positron energy distribution integrated over the polar angle is

References

 Lecture on Lepton Universality by Michel Davier at the 1997 SLAC Summer Institute.
 Electroweak Couplings, Lepton Universality, and the Origin of Mass: An Experimental Perspective, article by John Swain, from the Proceedings of the Third Latin American Symposium on High Energy Physics.

Electroweak theory